Acmocerini is a tribe of longhorn beetles of the subfamily Lamiinae. It was described by Thomson in 1864.

Taxonomy
 Acmocera Dejean, 1835
 Acridocera Jordan, 1903
 Acridoschema Thomson, 1858
 Discoceps Jordan, 1894
 Fasciculacmocera Breuning, 1966
 Mimacmocera Breuning, 1960

References

 
Lamiinae